Matheu may refer to:

People
 Domingo Matheu, Argentine politician
 Joan Clos i Matheu, mayor of Barcelona, Spain from 1997 to 2006
 Manuel de Falla, Spanish composer of classical music, full name "Manuel de Falla y Matheu"
 Matheu Hinzen, Dutch singer who represented the Netherlands in the Junior Eurovision Song Contest 2019
 Matheu Nelson (born 1999), American baseball player

Other
 Matheu, Buenos Aires, a settlement in Escobar Partido, Argentina

See also
 Matthew (name)